Peperomia galapagensis is a species of flowering plant in the Piperaceae (pepper) family. It is endemic to the Galapagos Islands.

Description
Peperomia galapagensis is a succulent epiphyte.

Range and habitat
Peperomia galapagensis is endemic to the Galapagos Islands where it grows in wet tropical regions.

Taxonomy

References

galapagensis
Flora of the Galápagos Islands